Electronically controlled brake (ECB) developed by Toyota Motor Corporation initially for its hybrid and Lexus models, is the world's first production brake-by-wire braking system. The ECB went on sale in Japan in June 2001, first appearing on the Toyota Estima hybrid (first generation), and making its North American debut with the launch of the Lexus RX 400h SUV in April 2005. The ECB is an integral part of the company's Vehicle Dynamics Integrated Management stability control system, by allowing for automatic brake adjustments, which work in conjunction with variable gear-ratio electric power steering systems.

Namesake 
 Not to be confused with electronically controlled pneumatic brakes for railways.

Applications 
 2001 Toyota Estima Hybrid
 2002 Toyota Alphard
Listed by (US model year):
 2004–2009 Toyota Prius
 2009–2015 Toyota Prius
 2006 Toyota Highlander Hybrid
 2006–2009 Lexus RX 400h
 2005–2007 Lexus GS 430
 2007–present Lexus GS 450h
 2007–present Lexus LS 460
 2008–present Lexus LS 600h
 2008–10 Lexus GS 460
 2010–present Lexus RX 450h
 2011 Lexus LFA

See also 
 brake-by-wire
 Sensotronic (Mercedes-Benz)

References 

Toyota
Lexus
Vehicle braking technologies